The 2022 Cal Poly Mustangs football team represented California Polytechnic State University as a member of the Big Sky Conference the 2022 NCAA Division I FCS football season. The Mustangs were led by third-year head coach Beau Baldwin and now played their home games at Mustang Memorial Field in San Luis Obispo, California.

Previous season
The Mustangs finished the 2021 season 2–9 overall and 1–7 in Big Sky play to tie for eighth place.

Preseason

Polls
On July 25, 2022, during the virtual Big Sky Kickoff, the Mustangs were predicted to finish tenth in the Big Sky by both the coaches and media.

Preseason All–Big Sky team
The Mustangs did not have any players selected to the preseason all-Big Sky team.

Roster

Schedule

Game summaries

at Fresno State

San Diego

at South Dakota

No. 5 Sacramento State

at Northern Arizona

at Idaho State

Eastern Washington

at UC Davis

at No. 16 Montana

No. 3 Montana State

Portland State

References

Cal Poly
Cal Poly Mustangs football seasons
Cal Poly Mustangs football